Ancylosis monella is a species of snout moth in the genus Ancylosis. It was described by Roesler in 1973 from Afghanistan, but is also found on Cyprus.

References

Moths described in 1973
monella
Moths of Europe
Moths of Asia